Apiorkor Seyiram Ashong–Abbey ( born 1 April 1988) is a Ghanaian poet, writer, literary critic. She is currently the Head of Programmes Production with Citi FM/Citi TV and currently the host of Diplomatic License and What's Cooking on Citi TV.

She is also an editorial advisor for The InfluencHER Project, an editorial program and global community seeking to empower and amplify female voices.

Education 
Apiorkor attended Tema International School where she graduated and completed a Diploma program. She later went to Lafayette College in the US, and came back to Ghana to study at the University of Ghana, Legon.

Career 
Apiorkor is the Head of Production at Citi FM/Citi TV and the host of ‘Diplomatic License’ and 'What's Cooking' on Citi TV.

Literary works

The Matriarch's Verse 
Apiorkor is the author of The Matriarch's Verse, a book of poems that seeks to celebrate, challenge, and highlight what it means to be Ghanaian in the 21st Century, of this is done from her perspective as a third-culture kid.

Performances

2019 Republica [Berlin] 
She performed at the 2019 edition of Republica held at Berlin, Germany.

TEDWomen 
Apiorkor performed at the 2020 edition of TEDWomen which is an annual TED conference organized by the TED headquarters in New York, USA.)

Sundance Film Festival 2021 
Apiorkor performed at the 2021 Sundance Film Festival which was held at the Park City, Salt Lake City, Utah in the United States. Apiorkor performed ‘Bewitched Vaginas".

Awards and Honours 
In 2022, the Ghana Association of Writers (GAW) awarded Apiorkor as a first-place winner for the Spoken Word category at the sixth edition of the organisation’s awards.

References 

Ghanaian women poets
Ghanaian journalists
Living people
21st-century Ghanaian poets
1988 births
Ghanaian poets